Kıroba is a small village in Dikili district of İzmir Province, Turkey.  It is situated to the north of Geyikli creek.  The population of the village is 66  as of 2011.

References

Villages in Dikili District